The eastern crested guineafowl (Guttera pucherani) is a member of the Numididae, the guineafowl bird family. It is found in open forest, woodland and forest-savanna mosaics. It was previously known as the crested guineafowl when the three species were lumped together. The eastern crested guineafowl is found in Somalia to Tanzania, Zanzibar and Tumbatu Island.

References

External links

eastern crested guineafowl
eastern crested guineafowl
eastern crested guineafowl